Mao Ning (born 23 May 1969) is a Chinese singer best known for his pop numbers The Waves Remain, Late Autumn, and The Blue Night and Blue Dream. Mao Ning had many partners, such as Chen Hong, Yang Yuying and Lin Ping. Many people called Mao and Yang "The cutest boy and girl".

Biography
Mao Ning was born into a musical family in Shenyang, Liaoning, on 23 May 1969. When he was young, he decided to be an athlete, so he used become a soccer play with his strong body. He graduated from Liaoning Sports Institute. While he was injured with his leg, he had to give up the sport, and made the transition as a singer. In 1987 he entered Liaoning Opera House. Mao Ning began his singing career in Guangzhou, capital of South China's Guangdong province, in 1990. That same year, he signed a contract with New Era of Audio-Visual Company of Guangzhou. His debut album, Please Let My Emotions Stay With You, was released in 1992, and in the same year, he won Favorite Male Singer of Guangdong Province. Mao Ning first rose to prominence in 1993 for singing The Waves Remain in CCTV New Year's Gala. In 1994, Mao and his partner Yang Yuying made a cross-country tour. In 1995 he went to Beijing to develop his career. Two years later, he signed with Sony Music Entertainment and Shanghai Audio-Visual Press. In 1998 he was listed as one of "Four Top Stars". In November 2000, Mao got hurt accidentally and fell into the lowest point in life and career. In 2003, Mao made his acting debut in Stories of the Wandering Hero, based on the novel by the same name by Liang Yusheng. In 2004, Mao signed with 21 East Record Company. In 2007 he became a member of the Hong Kong Buddhist Cultural Estate (HKBCE). His second solo album, titled Shi Er Zhong Mao Ning, was released in May 2012. In 2013, he worked as a judge at Your Face Sounds Familiar in Hunan Television. In August 2014, he hosted Dream Music Festival in Liaoning Television. On 27 December 2015, he was arrested in Beijing by Beijing Public Security Bureau, accused of using illegal substance. He was released due to not meet to the detention conditions in December 2015.

Singles
 The Waves Remain
 The Blue Night and Blue Dream
 How Many Loves Can Be That 
 The promise of Love 
 Late Autumn
 The Big Wave Cover the Sand
 Annie in Heart 
 Wait You in Old Place

Studio album

Television

References

See also
 Yin Xiangjie (another singer arrested for drug use)

1969 births
20th-century Chinese  male singers
21st-century Chinese  male singers
Musicians from Shenyang
Living people
Chinese Mandopop singers
Singers from Liaoning